Motormark were a Scottish electronic punk band formed in 2001. In early 2007 Motormark split up and members Jane and Marko founded a new band with two new members called FANGS. The band consisted of Jane Fisher (stage name Jane Motoro) and Mark Law (stage name Marko Poloroid).

Biography
Jane was in folk singing group, The Singing Kettle, with her parents Cilla and Artie. In 2001, she left to form Motormark with Mark Law, whose mother was a bass player with a Polish rock band.

Too Pure suggest they release some Motormark singles. Their Ramones sampler 'Lets Go' was released on Jane’s birthday, the same day Joey Ramone died, and NME dubbed it as ‘nauseating'.

Discography

Albums
 pop:up (2001)
 Chrome Tape (2004)

Singles
 Eat, Drink, Sleep, Think (2004)
 Note To Self (2006)

Samplers
 Let's Go (2001)

FANGS

FANGS are a touring punk band.

Mark is in the group under the name Marko Nein.  Jane is using the name Queen. Lloyd Alex on Synth and Jojo Doll on drums.

Lloyd Alex founded Glasgow electronic trio BabyBones with Greg Cossar and Margret Maclean in 2005.

Discography
Albums
Automatic Rocknroll (2011)

References

External links

Motormark
 Motormark Yahoo News Group

FANGS
 FANGS on Myspace
 FANGS official website

Scottish electronic music groups
British synth-pop groups
Digital hardcore music groups